Charles T. Logue (1922-2000) was a Democratic member of the Pennsylvania House of Representatives. He was born in Pittsburgh in 1922.

He was first elected in April 1976

References

Democratic Party members of the Pennsylvania House of Representatives
2000 deaths
1922 births
20th-century American politicians